Mohamed Fofana (born 7 May 1985) is a French footballer who plays for Francavilla.

His usual position is attacking midfielder and striker.

Club career
He was signed by newly promoted Ravenna on 6 July 2007 in a co-ownership bid. In mid-2009 he was sold to Arezzo in another co-ownership deal but bought back in June 2010. In July 2010 he was sold to SPAL.

After Siracusa was unable to play in 2012–13 professional league, Fofana was signed by Lanciano in a 2-year contract. His contract was later extended.

On 17 January 2014 Fofana was loaned to Salernitana. it was followed by Catanzaro in July 2014 and then Grosseto in January 2015.

On 28 January 2016 he was signed by Lupa Roma from Lanciano for an undisclosed fee. He was re-signed by Lupa Roma on 30 August.

References

External links
 Ravenna Profile 
 

1985 births
Living people
French sportspeople of Malian descent
Footballers from Paris
French footballers
Association football midfielders
A.S. Cittadella players
Ravenna F.C. players
Aurora Pro Patria 1919 players
S.S. Arezzo players
S.P.A.L. players
U.S. Siracusa players
S.S. Virtus Lanciano 1924 players
U.S. Salernitana 1919 players
U.S. Catanzaro 1929 players
F.C. Grosseto S.S.D. players
Lupa Roma F.C. players
A.S.D. Francavilla players
Serie B players
Serie C players
Serie D players
French expatriate footballers
French expatriate sportspeople in Italy
Expatriate footballers in Italy